Aílton Lira da Silva, best known as Aílton Lira (born in Araras, São Paulo State, February 19, 1951) was a former football (soccer) forward who currently manages Limeira Futebol Clube.

In career he played for Ponte Preta (1967–1972), Caldense (1972–1976), Santos F.C. (1976–1979), São Paulo Futebol Clube (1980), Al-Nassr in Saudi Arabia (1980–1982), Guarani (1982), União São João de Araras (1983), Comercial-Ribeirão Preto (1983), Portuguesa Santista (84 and 85), Itumbiara (1986–1987) and Guará where ended his career in 1988. He won the São Paulo State Championship Tournament two times; in 1978 for Santos and in 1980 for São Paulo.

References

1951 births
Living people
People from Araras
Brazilian footballers
Association football forwards
Guarani FC players
Associação Atlética Ponte Preta players
Santos FC players
São Paulo FC players
Al Nassr FC players
Brazilian football managers
Saudi Professional League players
Expatriate footballers in Saudi Arabia
Brazilian expatriate sportspeople in Saudi Arabia
Footballers from São Paulo (state)